1000 Friends of Oregon is a private, non-profit 501(c)(3) organization that advocates for land-use planning. It was incorporated on October 11, 1974, following the creation of Oregon's statewide land-use system in 1973 by then-governor Tom McCall and attorney Henry Richmond.  By 1994, the organization had about 2,500 contributors and supporters.  Richmond served as the organization's first executive director.

Richmond was succeeded as executive director in later years by Robert Liberty (in 1994), Bob Stacey (2002–09), Jason Miner  (March 2010 to Nov. 2016), Russ Hoeflich (April 2017), and Sam Diaz (October 2021).

Past initiatives

During the 1980s, one of the group's ongoing activities was fighting what it saw as improper land-use by the rapidly growing community of Rajneeshpuram, created in a rural part of central Oregon by the followers of the guru Bhagwan Shree Rajneesh.

Measures 37 and 49
The group strongly opposed Measure 37, a controversial land-use ballot initiative passed by Oregon voters in 2004.  1000 Friends brought litigation in 2005 that led to Measure 37's being ruled unconstitutional by a circuit court, but the ruling was later overturned by the Oregon Supreme Court. The organization then advocated for the passage of 2007's Measure 49, which voters ultimately approved, and which limited the impacts of Measure 37.

See also 
 Land use in Oregon
 Hector Macpherson Jr.

References

External links
1000 Friends of Oregon (official website)

Charities based in Oregon
Nature conservation organizations based in the United States
Organizations established in 1974
Environmental organizations based in Oregon
1974 establishments in Oregon